Orhan Uçak (born 1 January 1956) is a former football defender who played for clubs in Turkey and a manager.

Career
Born in Adana, Uçak played for local side Adana Demirspor during his entire senior football career. He made over 250 Süper Lig appearances in a 10-year stint with the club.

After he retired from playing football, Uçak became a manager for several lower-level Turkish clubs. He was appointed manager of Adana Demirspor in 2005.

References

External links
 
 
 Orhan Uçak manager stats at Mackolik.com

1956 births
Living people
Turkish footballers
Adana Demirspor footballers
Turkish football managers
Adana Demirspor managers
Association football defenders